Vermont/Beverly station is an underground rapid transit (known locally as a subway) station on the B Line of the Los Angeles Metro Rail system. It is located under Vermont Avenue at its intersection with Beverly Boulevard, after which the station is named, near the border of the Los Angeles neighborhoods of East Hollywood and Wilshire Center.

Service

Station layout
Vermont/Beverly is a two-story station; the top level is a mezzanine with ticket machines while the bottom is the platform level. The station uses a island platform with two tracks.

Hours and frequency

Connections 
, the following connections are available:

Station artwork 

Vermont/Beverly, like many of the B Line stations, was designed by an artist/architect team. For this station, artist George Stone collaborated with architects Anil Verma Associates. Their design features natural-looking rock formations on all levels of the station, which purposefully contrast with the glass-clad columns soaring from the station platform.

Artist George Stone designed the rocks based on the geology of the station location. The artist and architects said they embraced the concept of inserting the uniquely shaped rocks into the traditional shape of a station "box."

The design is meant to remind riders that the station exists within a natural geological setting, while the artificial nature of the rocks recalls the props used on nearby Hollywood sets and the area's theme parks.

References

B Line (Los Angeles Metro) stations
East Hollywood, Los Angeles
Railway stations in the United States opened in 1999
1999 establishments in California